Joseph Charles Sambito (born June 28, 1952) is a former pitcher in Major League Baseball who played for the Houston Astros (1976–1982, 1984), New York Mets (1985) and Boston Red Sox (1986–1987). He batted and threw left-handed.

Early life
He graduated from Bethpage High School in Bethpage, New York. A fastball and slider specialist, Sambito was a starter in the minors, as he led the Southern League in strikeouts at Triple-A Columbus in 1975. A year later he was promoted to the Astros, where he moved into a relief role.

Major league career
Sambito was called to the majors in July of the 1976 season. He made his first pitching appearance in July 20 in relief of Tom Griffin while facing the Pittsburgh Pirates (Griffin had managed just one out on six batters of the first inning). Sambito pitched 4 innings while allowing three runs on seven hits with two walks. Sambito made appearances in twenty games that year, which included four starts and eight times called to finish a game.  It was during the season that he had his only complete game in the majors. On August 29, he beat the St. Louis Cardinals with a four-hit performance that also served as his only shutout. On September 24, he collected his first save. He went 3-2 with 53 innings pitched on 26 strikeouts and fourteen walks. The following year, he was sent to pitch in further games, appearing in 54 (with only one start) that resulted in seven saves in 89 innings pitched while striking out 67 batters with 24 walks on a 5-5 record.

He made eleven saves the following year in 88 innings pitched while having a career high in strikeouts (96). In 1979, he continued the trend with further improvement, collecting 22 saves (a career high) and a 1.78 ERA in 1979 – a season in which he posted a string of 40 consecutive innings without allowing an earned run (doing so from May 3 to July 14) and was named to the National League All-Star team; he pitched a career high 91 innings pitched while striking out 83 batters with 23 walks. In 1980, Sambito and the Astros would reach the postseason. He appeared in 64 games for 90 total innings pitched, which resulted in a 2.19 ERA and seventeen saves as he struck out 75 batters with 22 walks. While he did not make the All-Star team, he finished fifth in voting for the Cy Young Award. Sambito and the Astros reached the 1980 National League Championship Series against the Philadelphia Phillies with a chance to reach the World Series. Sambito appeared in three of the five games of the Series. In Game 2, he walked a batter and struck out a batter. In Game 4, with the Astros needing just one victory to win the Series, Sambito was sent out to pitch in a shaky eighth inning that saw him as the third pitcher used by the team (which saw a 2-0 lead turn into a tie). Sambito struck-out the first batter he saw before allowing a sacrifice fly by Manny Trillo that resulted in a 3-2 lead for Philadelphia at the end of the play and inning. He would pitch the ninth inning before Houston rallied to force the tenth inning. Sambito was sent out to pitch that inning; Greg Luzinski and Manny Trillo would each hit RBI doubles to give Philadelphia a 5-3 lead that they would hold on to tie the series at two. The next day, Sambito was sent out again in the eighth inning of a shaky situation. Houston had seen a 5-2 lead turn into 5-3 with the bases loaded and no out. Sambito faced Keith Moreland, which resulted in a groundout that scored a runner to make it 5-4. Sambito was replaced by Ken Forsch, who allowed three runs in the inning to make it 7-5 in a game Houston later lost 8-7.

Sambito pitched a 1.84 ERA in 49 games in 1981, receiving ten saves in 63 innings pitched while striking out 41 batters with 22 walks. Sambito pitched in two games of the 1981 National League Division Series against the Los Angeles Dodgers. In Game 2, He was sent to pitch the top of the eleventh inning of a scoreless tie. He allowed one hit and no runs before Denny Walling won the game in the bottom of the eleventh to give Houston the victory. Sambito pitched Game 3 in the eighth inning of a 3-1 deficit and allowed four hits that scored three runs as the Dodgers won 6-1; Houston would lose the next two games, but Sambito did not appear in any of them. He started 1982 with four saves and a 0.71 ERA in nine appearances in April, before it was discovered that bone chips had damaged the ligaments of his pitching elbow. He missed the rest of the season and all of 1983 recuperating from Tommy John surgery. He appeared in 32 games for the 1984 team, pitching 47 innings as a middle-man pitcher with no save chances, which resulted in a 3.02 ERA. He was released by the Astros on April 8, 1985 and signed as a free agent with the New York Mets on April 26. He was released on August 23 after pitching in eight games that saw him walk eight batters with three strikeouts and a 12.66 ERA.
 
He appeared in 53 games for 44 innings while going a perfect 12-for-12 on save opportunities with a 4.84 ERA with thirty strikeouts to sixteen walks, as he helped the Red Sox reach the World Series. Arguably his most memorable save as a Red Sox came on June 17, 1986. Holding onto a one-run lead, Sambito retired Don Mattingly and Dave Winfield with the bases loaded to close out the game. Sambito appeared in three of the seven games of the 1986 American League Championship Series, which included a blown save in the ninth inning of Game 5, as he allowed a RBI single to tie the game at six in a must-win situation (Boston would win the game in the eleventh inning and win the series three days later). Sambito appeared in two games of the 1986 World Series against the New York Mets, which included Game 7. He pitched to three batters in the bottom of the seventh inning in relief of Calvin Schiraldi, who had turned a 3-3 tie into a 5-3 deficit. Sambito walked two batters and allowed a sacrifice fly to make it 6-3; Boston would lose the game and series 8-5. He retired in 1987 after posting a 2–6 record with 6.93 ERA. In an eleven season career, Sambito posted a 37–38 record with a 3.03 ERA and 84 saves in 461 games.

Post career
Following his retirement, Sambito became a players counselor and representative. Some of his clients have included Andy Pettitte, Ryan Klesko, Jeff D'Amico and Morgan Ensberg.

Sambito currently resides in Irvine, California.

On July 28, 2013, Sambito was inducted into the inaugural class of the Bethpage High School Athletic Wall of Fame.

References

External links
, or  Retrosheet, or Pura Pelota (Venezuelan Winter League), or Joe Sambito - Baseballbiography.com, or Astros Daily interview

1952 births
Living people
Adelphi Panthers baseball players
Adelphi University alumni
American sports agents
Baseball players from New York (state)
Boston Red Sox players
Cedar Rapids Astros players
Columbus Astros players
Covington Astros players
Houston Astros players
Major League Baseball pitchers
Memphis Blues players
National League All-Stars
New York Mets players
People from Bethpage, New York
People from Irvine, California
Sportspeople from Brooklyn
Baseball players from New York City
St. Petersburg Pelicans players
Tidewater Tides players
Tigres de Aragua players
Tucson Toros players